Icheon is a city in Gyeonggi Province, South Korea.

Together with Yeoju, Icheon is known as a center of South Korean ceramic manufacturing and is a UNESCO City of Crafts and Folk Art. Other famous local products include peaches and rice. Local institutions of higher learning include  Korea Tourism College and Chungkang College of Cultural Industries.

Icheon is home to Hynix, the world's second largest memory chip maker.

Fires
Major building fires occurred on 7 January 2008 and on 29 April 2020.

Geography
Neighboring districts include Yeoju City, Gwangju City, Yongin City, and Anseong City within Gyeonggi Province, as well as Eumseong County in North Chungcheong Province.

The Yeongdong Expressway and Jungbu Naeryuk Expressway pass through Icheon. In 2016, the city will connect into the Seoul Metropolitan Subway via Yeoju Line's Icheon Station.

Administrative divisions
Dongnam-gu is divided into 2 towns (eup), 8 townships (myeon), and 4 neighbourhoods (dong).

Climate
Icheon has a humid continental climate (Dwa in the Köppen climate classification).

City symbols
 City bird: Magpie
 City flower: Azaleas
 City tree: Pine

Ceramic village

The Icheon Ceramics Village features 300-plus ceramics-making firms in the area of Sugwang-ri, Sindun-myeon, Saeum-dong, and a popular visitor attraction. They use traditional skills and produce porcelains in some 40 traditional firewood kilns. This pottery is recognized both at home and abroad for its quality.

The Saeum-dong and Sindun-myeon areas also include a ceramics village with many ceramics stores. Potters have researched traditional methods and revived the manufacture of ceramics in the style of Goryeo celadon and Joseon white porcelain here. The village is the center of the effort to preserve these traditions.

Twin towns – sister cities

Icheon is twinned with:

 Jingdezhen, China (1997)
 Kōka, Japan (2005)

 Santa Fe, United States (2013)
 Seto, Japan (2006)
 Wuxi, China (2005)

Notable people
 Seo Hui: The historic figure of Goryeo dynasty who made a huge decision with Khitan people who was forcefully occupying northern areas of Korean peninsula.
 Kang Mi-na (Hangul: 강미나): South Korean singer, rapper, dancer, actress and K-pop idol, former member of K-pop girlgroup Gugudan and its subunits Gugudan 5959 and Gugudan SeMiNa.

See also
 Korean pottery
 Geography of South Korea
 List of cities in South Korea

References

External links

  
 Icheon : Official Seoul City Tourism 
 City Council website 

 

 
Cities in Gyeonggi Province